Editing In the Mi(d)st is a ballet made by Miriam Mahdaviani to Oliver Knussen's The Way to Castle Yonder and excerpts from his Music for a Puppet Court and Aaron Jay Kernis' Overture in Feet and Meters. The premiere took place June 21, 2002, as part of New York City Ballet's Diamond Project V at the New York State Theater, Lincoln Center.

Original cast 

Jennie Somogyi
Alexandra Ansanelli
James Fayette
Sébastien Marcovici

Reviews  
NY Times by Anna Kisselgoff, June 25, 2002
review in the Village Voice by Lynn Garafola, July 2, 2002
Critical Dance review by Kate Snedeker, June 21, 2002

Ballets by Miriam Mahdaviani
Ballets to the music of Oliver Knussen
2002 ballet premieres
New York City Ballet repertory
New York City Ballet Diamond Project